This is a sortable List of compositions by Vagn Holmboe (1909–1996). The works are categorized by the M. number (for Meta) from Paul Rapoport's catalogue where known, and by the opus number assigned by the composer where applicable. Title, date of composition and genre are also provided.

List
{| class="wikitable sortable"
|-
! M. !! Op. !! Title !! Date !! Genre !! Remarks
|-
|-style="display:none;"
| -1 || -1 || !a || -1 || !a || !a
|-
|  ||  || Violin sonata || 1924 || Chamber ||
|-
| 1 ||   || Duo for 2 violins || 1926 || Chamber || 
|-
| 2 ||   || Trio || 1926 || Chamber || For 3 violins, or flute and 2 violins.
|-
| 3 ||   || String quartet 'a', in C minor || 1926 || Chamber (string quartet) || 
|-
| 4 ||   || String quartet 'b', in E minor || 1927 || Chamber (string quartet) || 
|-
| 5 ||   || Nocturne || 1927 || Vocal || With string quartet accompaniment.
|-
| 6 ||   || Symphony 'a', in F minor, Sinfonia Utopia || 1927 || Orchestral (symphony) || 
|-
| 7 ||   || Scherzo || 1928 || Piano || 
|-
| 8 ||   || Piece for 3 violins || 1928 || Chamber || 
|-
| 9 ||   || String quartet 'c', in C minor || 1928 || Chamber (string quartet) || Incomplete.
|-
| 10 ||   || Symphony 'b', in D minor || 1928 || Orchestral (symphony) || Incomplete.
|-
| 11 ||   || Bagatelle No. 1, Arabesque || 1928 || Chamber || For violin and piano. There are no further 'bagatelles'.
|-
| 12 ||   || Stjerner (Stars) || 1928 || Vocal || 
|-
| 13 ||   || String quintet in E flat major || 1928 || Chamber || A 'viola' quintet.
|-
| 14 ||   || 12 little pieces for piano || 1928-29 || Piano ||
|-
| 15 ||   || Molto allegro scherzando, for solo violin || 1929 || Solo Instrument || 
|-
| 16 ||   || Chorale fantasy in E minor || 1929 || Piano || 
|-
| 17 ||   || String quartet 'd', in D minor || 1929 || Chamber (string quartet) || 
|-
| 18 ||   || String quartet 'e' || 1929-30 || Chamber (string quartet) || 
|-
| 19 ||   || Piano sonata 'a' || 1929 || Piano || 
|-
| 20 ||   || Violin sonata 'a' || 1929 || Chamber || 
|-
| 21 ||   || Concerto for Orchestra || 1929 || Concerto || 
|-
| 22 ||   || Prelude || 1930 || Piano || A variant of this piece is a movement in M. 23.
|-
| 23 ||   || Piano suite 'a' || 1930 || Piano || 
|-
| 24 ||   || String trio 'a' || 1930 || Chamber || 
|-
| 25 ||   || Piano sonata 'b' || 1930 || Piano || 
|-
| 26 ||   || 4 pieces for piano || 1930 || Piano || 2nd half of a collection of children's pieces.
|-
| 27 ||   || Quintet || 1930 || Chamber || Incomplete. Scoring unknown.
|-
| 28 ||   || Quartet || 1930 || Chamber || For flute, oboe, viola and cello.
|-
| 29 ||   || String quartet 'f' || 1930 || Chamber (string quartet) || 
|-
| 30 ||   || Symphony for piano || 1930 || Piano ||
|-
| 31 ||   || Klaverstykker for børn (Piano pieces for children) || 1930 || Piano || 1st half of a collection of children's pieces.
|-
|  31a ||   || Nocturne || 1930 || Piano ||
|-
| 32 ||   || 1- and 2-part piano pieces || 1930 || Piano 
|-
| 33 ||   || Allegro affetuoso || 1931 || Piano ||
|-
| 34 ||   || Little pieces || 1931 ||  || Scoring unknown, probably piano or recorders.
|-
| 35 ||   || Requiem || 1931 || Choral || For children's choir and chamber orchestra.
|-
| 36 ||   || Amatørklaver I (Amateur piano I) || 1931 || Piano || Part of a collection of suites and dances.
|-
| 37 ||   || Duets for recorder || 1931 || Chamber ||
|-
| 38 ||   || Piano pieces || 1931 || Piano || 
|-
| 39 ||   || 1-, 2- and 3-part piano pieces || 1931 || Piano
|-
| 40 ||   || 3 songs for children's choir || 1931 || Choral (unaccompanied) || 
|-
| 41 ||   || Concerto, for chamber orchestra || 1931 || Concerto || 
|-
| 42 ||   || Allegro sostenuto for violin and piano || 1931 || Chamber || 
|-
| 43 ||   || String trio 'b' || 1931 || Chamber || 
|-
| 44 ||   || Provinsen (The Provinces) || 1931 || Choral || Accompaniment is flute, oboe, violin and cello.
|-
| 45 ||   || Christmas 1931 || 1931 || Piano || 
|-
| 46 ||   || String trio 'c' || 1931 || Chamber || 
|-
| 47 ||   || Piano suite 'b' || 1931 || Piano || Part of a collection of suites and dances.
|-
| 48 ||   || Concerto for piano || 1931 || Piano || 
|-
| 49 ||   || Chamber Music No. 1 || 1931 || Orchestral || For chamber orchestra.
|-
| 50 ||   || 2 Danish peasant dances / 2 Folk songs from Jutland / Dance in 5/8 time || 1931 || Piano || Part of a collection of suites and dances.
|-
| 51 ||   || 7 preludes || 1932 || Piano || 
|-
| 52 ||   || String quartet 'g' || 1932 || Chamber (string quartet) || 
|-
| 53 ||   || 5 Duets for flute and viola || 1932 || Chamber || 
|-
| 54 ||   || Trio || 1932 || Chamber || Completed in 1939. For oboe, french horn and bassoon.
|-
| 55 ||   || Chamber Music No. 2 || 1932 || Orchestral || For strings. Incorporated into M. 72.
|-
| 56 ||   || Capriccio for piano || 1932 || Piano || 
|-
| 57 ||   || Suite for chamber orchestra || 1932 || Orchestral || Revised 1932-33. Incorporated into M. 72 and M. 73.
|-
| 58 ||   || Overture 'a' || 1932 || Orchestral || For chamber orchestra.
|-
| 59 ||   || Overture 'b' || 1932 || Orchestral || First version for full orchestra. Revised version for strings.
|-
| 60 ||   || 7 Duos for flute and violin || 1932 || Chamber || 
|-
| 61 ||   || 4 Duos for flute and cello || 1932 || Chamber || 
|-
| 62 ||   || String trio 'd' || 1932 || Chamber || Also a version for flute, clarinet and bassoon.
|-
| 63 ||   || Music I for School Orchestra  || 1932 || Orchestral || For strings.
|-
| 64 ||   || Chamber Music No. 3 || 1932 || Percussion || 
|-
| 65 ||   || Weg in Dezember (Away in December) || 1933 || Vocal || 
|-
| 66 ||   || Amatørklaver II (Amateur piano II) || 1933 || Piano || Revision of M. 36.
|-
| 67 ||   || Piano suite 'c' || 1933 || Piano || 
|-
| 68 ||   || String quartet 'h' || 1933 || Chamber (string quartet) || 
|-
| 69 ||   || Divertimento No. 1 || 1933 || Orchestral || For chamber orchestra.
|-
| 70 ||   || Wind quintet || 1933 || Chamber || 
|-
| 71 ||   || Divertimento No. 3 || 1933 || Chamber || For 2 oboes, 2 trumpets and 2 trombones.
|-
| 72 ||   || Divertimento No. 2 || 1933 || Orchestral || Revised 1976. For strings.
|-
| 73 ||   || Concerto, for strings || 1933 || Concerto || 
|-
| 74 ||   || Symphony 'c' || 1933 || Orchestral (symphony) || Incomplete.
|-
| 75 ||   || De danske tålte ikke tvang (The Danes Would Not Stand Coercion) || 1934 || Choral (unaccompanied) || 
|-
| 76 ||   || 6 Sketches || 1934 || Piano || 
|-
| 77 ||   || Chamber Music No. 4 || 1934 || Chamber || For oboe, violin and cello. Incorporated into M. 90.
|-
| 78 ||   || 10 Romanian Dances || 1934 || Piano || 
|-
| 79 || 1 || Suite No. 1 for chamber orchestra || 1935 || Orchestral || 
|-
| 80 ||   || Overture 'c' || 1935 || Orchestral || 
|-
| 81 ||   || 2 songs || 1935 || Vocal || Scoring of accompaniment is unknown.
|-
| 82 ||   2a || Violin Sonata No. 1 || 1935 || Chamber || 
|-
| 83 ||   2b || Chamber Sonata No. 1, for violin and string orchestra || 1935 || Orchestra with soloist || Orchestral arrangement of M. 82. There are no further 'chamber sonatas'. 
|-
| 84 ||   || Serenade || 1935 || Chamber || For flute, clarinet and bassoon. Incorporated into M. 90.
|-
| 85 || 4 || Symphony No. 1 || 1935 || Orchestral (symphony) || For chamber orchestra.
|-
| 86 ||   || Romanian Suite for piano and chamber orchestra || 1935 || Orchestra with soloist || Incorporated into M. 88.
|-
| 87 || 5 || Rhapsody for flute and chamber orchestra || 1935 || Orchestra with soloist || 
|-
| 88 || 6 || Suite No. 2 for chamber orchestra || 1935-36 || Orchestral || 
|-
| 89 ||   || Little Overture || 1936 || Orchestral || For 2 soloists and orchestra. Also a version for flute, violin and piano.
|-
| 90 || 3 || Serenade || 1936 || Chamber || For flute, clarinet, violin, viola and cello.
|-
| 91 ||   7a || 3 Lyriske Sang (Lyrical Songs) || 1936 || Vocal || 
|-
| 92 ||   7b || Stilfaerdige Sange (Quiet Songs) || 1936 || Vocal || 
|-
| 93 ||   || Rhapsody for clarinet and violin || 1936 || Chamber || Incorporated into M. 104.
|-
| 94 || 9 || Quartet || 1936 || Chamber || Revised 1937. For flute, violin, cello and piano.
|-
| 95 ||   || Den dovne trillebør (The Lazy Wheelbarrow) || 1936 || Choral (unaccompanied) || 
|-
| 96 || 10 || Quintet || 1936 || Chamber || For flute, oboe, clarinet, violin and viola.
|-
| 97 || 11 || Suite No. 3 for chamber orchestra || 1936 || Orchestral || 
|-
| 98 ||   || 2 Romanian dances || 1937 || Piano || Incorporated into M. 99.
|-
| 99 ||   12a || Rumænsk Suite (Romanian Suite) || 1937 || Piano || 
|-
| 100 ||   || New piano pieces || 1937 || Piano || Incomplete.
|-
| 101 ||   12b || Dansk Suite (Danish Suite) || 1937-38 || Piano || 
|-
| 102 ||   13a || Psalm 62 || 1937 || Choral (unaccompanied) || For children's choir.
|-
| 103 ||  13b || Concerto-Symphony for violin and orchestra || 1937 || Concerto || Incomplete.
|-
| 104 || 8 || Rhapsodic Intermezzo for clarinet, violin and piano || 1938 || Chamber || 
|-
| 105 || 14 || Violin Concerto No. 1 || 1938 || Concerto || 
|-
| 106 ||   || Music for Violin Choir || 1938 || Orchestral || 
|-
| 107 || 15 || Symphony No. 2 || 1938-39 || Orchestral (symphony) || 
|-
| 108 ||   || Concertino, for chamber orchestra || 1938 || Concerto || 
|-
| 109 ||   || Rumænsk Suite (Romanian Suite) || 1938 || Orchestral || Orchestration of M. 99. Incomplete.
|-
| 110 ||   || Dansk Suite (Danish Suite) || 1938 || Orchestral || Orchestration of M. 101.
|-
| 111 ||   || Klavermusik for børn (Piano music for children) || 1938 || Piano ||
|-
| 112 || 16 || Violin Sonata No. 2 || 1939 || Chamber || 
|-
| 113 || 17 || (Chamber) Concerto No. 1, for piano || 1939 || Concerto || 
|-
| 114 ||  || 6 piano pieces || 1939 || Piano || 
|-
| 115 ||   || Etude || 1939 || Piano || 
|-
| 116 || 18 || Serenade || 1940 || Chamber || For flute, violin, cello and piano.
|-
| 117 || 23 || Fanden og borgmesteren (The Devil and the Mayor) || 1940 || Stage || Described as a 'symphonic fantasy play'.
|-
| 118 || 19 || Notturno for wind quintet || 1940 || Chamber || 
|-
| 119 ||    || Cantata No. 1 || 1940 || Choral || Lost.
|-
| 120 || 20 || (Chamber) Concerto No. 2, for flute and violin || 1940 || Concerto || 
|-
| 121 || 21 || (Chamber) Concerto No. 3, for clarinet || 1940-42 || Concerto || Revised 1976.
|-
| 122 ||   || 2 songs || 1940 || Choral (unaccompanied) || 
|-
| 123 || 22 || Concertino No. 1 for violin, viola and string orchestra || 1940 || Concerto || 
|-
| 124 ||   || Jeg har sortnende hede og hvidtnende sande (I have Darkening Heath and Lightening Sands) || 1940 || Choral (unaccompanied) || 
|-
| 125 || 24 || Concertino No. 2 for violin and string orchestra || 1940 || Concerto || Lost.
|-
| 126 || 25 || Symphony No. 3, Sinfonia Rustica || 1941 || Orchestral (symphony) || 
|-
| 127 ||   || 3-voice Canons (first set) || 1941 || Choral (unaccompanied) || 
|-
| 128 ||   || 3-voice Canons (second set) || 1941 || Choral (unaccompanied) || 
|-
| 129 || 26 || String quartet 'i' || 1941 || Chamber (string quartet) || Further work 1944 and 1949. Possibly incomplete. Not part of numbered quartet series, despite being assigned opus number.
|-
| 130 ||   27a || Sonatina briosa || 1941 || Piano || 
|-
| 131 || 28 || Symphonic Overture || 1941 || Orchestral || 
|-
| 132 || 29 || Symphony No. 4, Sinfonia Sacra || 1941 || Orchestral (symphony) || Revised 1945. Includes choral part.
|-
| 133 ||   || Cantata No. 2 || 1941 || Choral || Written for the 200th anniversary of the death of Vitus Bering.
|-
| 134 ||   32a || Den galsindede tyrk (The Ill-Tempered Turk) || 1942-44 || Ballet || Orchestral suite from this work is M. 242.
|-
| 135 ||   27b || Sonatina capricciosa || 1942 || Chamber || For flute and piano.
|-
| 136 ||   || 5 Epigrams || 1942 || Piano || 
|-
| 137 ||   || Cantata No. 3 || 1942 || Choral || Written for the 500th anniversary of Horsens.
|-
| 138 ||   || Cantata No. 4 || 1942/45 || Choral || Lost.
|-
| 139 || 30 || (Chamber) Concerto No. 4, for piano trio || 1942 || Concerto || 
|-
| 140 ||   || 2 songs || 1942 || Vocal || 
|-
| 141 || 31 || (Chamber) Concerto No. 5, for viola || 1943 || Concerto || 
|-
| 142 || 36 || Jeg ved en urt så dejlig og bold (I Know a Plant so Lovely and Fine) || 1943 || Choral (unaccompanied) || 
|-
| 143 || 33 || (Chamber) Concerto No. 6, for violin || 1943 || Concerto || 
|-
| 144 || 34 || 5 Lagerkvist Songs || 1943/47 || Choral (unaccompanied) || No. 1 is for men's chorus, others are for mixed chorus.
|-
| 145 || 35 || Symphony No. 5 || 1944 || Orchestral (symphony) || 
|-
| 146 ||    || String quartet 'j' || 1944 || Chamber (string quartet) || Probably incomplete. 
|-
| 147 || 37 || (Chamber) Concerto No. 7, for oboe || 1944-45 || Concerto || 
|-
| 148 || 38 || (Chamber) Concerto No. 8, Sinfonia Concertante || 1945 || Concerto || 
|-
| 149 || 39 || (Chamber) Concerto No. 9, for violin and viola || 1945-46 || Concerto || 
|-
| 150 || 40 || (Chamber) Concerto No. 10, Træ-messing-tarm (Wood-Brass-Gut) || 1945-46 || Concerto || 
|-
| 151 || 41 || Rosette (Sonatina) || 1946 || Vocal || Duet. Revised 1980.
|-
| 152 ||   || Cantata No. 5, Århundredstjernen (The Centenary Star) || 1946 || Choral || 
|-
| 153 ||   || Lave og Jon (Lave and Jon) || 1946-48 || Opera || 
|-
| 154 || 42 || Music for radio play Fløjten (The Flute) || 1946 || Incidental music || Lost.
|-
| 155 || 43 || Symphony No. 6 || 1947 || Orchestral (symphony) || 
|-
| 156 ||   || Cantata No. 6 || 1947 || Choral || Lost.
|-
| 157 || 44 || (Chamber) Concerto No. 11, for trumpet || 1948 || Concerto || 
|-
| 158 ||   || Ikke forlig (No Compromise) || 1948 || Choral (unaccompanied) || 
|-
| 159 || 46 || String Quartet No. 1 || 1948-49 || Chamber (string quartet) || 
|-
| 160 ||   45a || 12 Danske skaemteviser (Danish Jesting Ballads) || 1948 || Vocal || 
|-
| 161 || 47 || String Quartet No. 2 || 1949 || Chamber (string quartet) || 
|-
| 162 ||   45b || Træer og vaekster (Trees and Plants) || 1949 || Vocal || 
|-
| 163 ||   45c || Bjergenes sang (Song of the Mountains) || 1949-52 || Vocal || Revised 1991.
|-
| 164 ||   || Cantata No. 7 || 1949 || Choral || Written for the 50th anniversary of the Danish Nursing Council.
|-
| 165 || 48 || String Quartet No. 3 || 1949-50 || Chamber (string quartet) || 
|-
| 166 || 49 || Suono da bardo || 1949-50 || Piano || 
|-
| 167 || 50 || Symphony No. 7 || 1950 || Orchestral (symphony) || In one movement.
|-
| 168 || 51 || Isomeric (Duo Concertante) || 1950 || Chamber || For 2 violins and piano.
|-
| 169 || 52 || (Chamber) Concerto No. 12, for trombone || 1950 || Concerto || 
|-
| 170 ||   || Cantata No. 8 || 1950 || Choral || Lost.
|-
| 171 || 53 || Chamber symphony No. 1 || 1951 || Orchestral || 
|-
| 172 || 54 || Liber Canticorum Book I || 1951 || Choral (unaccompanied) || 
|-
| 173 ||   || Film score, J. F. Willumsen|| 1951 || Incidental music || Film about the Danish artist.  The written score is missing.
|-
| 174 || 55 || Primavera (Spring) || 1951 || Chamber || For flute, violin, cello and piano.
|-
| 175 || 56 || Symphony No. 8, Sinfonia Boreale || 1951-52 || Orchestral (symphony) || 
|-
| 176 || 57 || Moya (Mist) (7 Japanese Songs) || 1952 || Vocal || 
|-
| 177 || 58 || Sendebude (Messengers) || 1952 || Vocal || 
|-
| 178 || 59 || Liber Canticorum Book II || 1952-53 || Choral (unaccompanied) || 
|-
| 179 || 60 || Liber Canticorum Book III || 1953 || Choral (unaccompanied) || 
|-
| 180 || 61 || Liber Canticorum Book IV || 1953 || Choral (unaccompanied) || 
|-
| 181 || 62 || Træet (The Tree) || 1953 || Choral || With orchestra.
|-
| 182 ||    || Solo Violin Sonata || 1953 || Solo Instrument || Incomplete. Incorporated into M. 183.
|-
| 183 || 63 || String Quartet No. 4 || 1953-54 || Chamber (string quartet) || Revised 1956.
|-
| 184 || 64 || Piano Trio || 1954 || Chamber || 
|-
| 185 || 65 || Sinfonia in memoriam || 1954-55 || Orchestral (symphonic metamorphosis) || Originally presented as "Symphony No. 9".
|-
| 186 ||   || Cantata No. 9 || 1955 || Choral || Written for Randers Central Hospital.
|-
| 187 || 67 || (Chamber) Concerto No. 13, for oboe and viola || 1955-56 || Concerto || 
|-
| 188 || 66 || String Quartet No. 5 || 1955 || Chamber (string quartet) || 
|-
| 189 || 68 || Epitaph || 1956 || Orchestral (symphonic metamorphosis) ||
|-
| 190 || 69 || 3 Inuit Songs (1st set) || 1956 || Choral || For baritone, chorus and timpani.
|-
| 191 || 70 || Quartetto medico || 1956 || Chamber || For flute, oboe, clarinet and piano.
|-
| 192 || 71 || Solo Flute Sonata || 1957 || Solo Instrument || 
|-
| 193 || 72 || Aspekter (Aspects) for wind quintet || 1957 || Chamber || 
|-
| 194 ||   73a || Sinfonia I || 1957 || Orchestral || The four parts of Op. 73 can be played separately or combined into a single work, Kairos.
|-
| 195 ||   || Cantata No. 10 || 1957 || Choral || Lost.
|-
| 196 ||   73b || Sinfonia II || 1957 || Orchestral || Part of Kairos - see M. 194.
|-
| 197 ||   || Concertino for 4 recorders and string orchestra || 1957 || Concerto || 
|-
| 198 ||    || Cantata No. 11 || 1958 || Choral || Lost. For the Royal Veterinary and Agricultural College's 100th anniversary.
|-
| 199 ||    || Simeons lovsång (Simeon's Song of Praise) || 1958 || Choral (unaccompanied) || 
|-
| 200 ||   73c || Sinfonia III || 1958-59|| Orchestral || Part of Kairos - see M. 194.
|-
| 201 ||    || Cantata No. 12 || 1958-59 || Choral || For Aarhus University's anniversary.
|-
| 202 ||    || 3 songs || 1959 || Choral (unaccompanied) || 
|-
| 203 ||    || Music for Gnavpotten (The Grouch) || 1959 || Incidental music || Lost.
|-
| 204 ||    || Kniven (The Knife) || 1959-60 || Opera || Full score missing, but vocal score extant.
|-
| 205 || 74 || Skoven (The Forest) || 1960 || Choral || With orchestra.
|-
| 206 || 75 || Tropos for string quintet || 1960 || Chamber || A 'viola' quintet.
|-
| 207 || 76 || Monolith || 1960 || Orchestral (symphonic metamorphosis) || 
|-
| 208 || 77 || Solhymne (Hymn to the Sun) || 1960 || Choral (unaccompanied) || Text by Akhenaten.
|-
| 209 ||    || 3 songs || 1960 || Choral || With piano accompaniment.
|-
| 210 || 78 || String Quartet No. 6 || 1961 || Chamber (string quartet) || 
|-
| 211 ||    || 5 Børnesange (Children's Songs) || 1961 || Choral (unaccompanied) || 
|-
| 212 || 79 || Brass Quintet No. 1 || 1961-62 || Chamber || 
|-
| 213 || 80 || Epilog || 1961-62 || Orchestral (symphonic metamorphosis) || Originally presented as "Symphony No. 9".
|-
| 214 || 81 || Hevjið í homrum (Raise in the Passes) || 1962/64 || Choral (unaccompanied) || 
|-
| 215 ||   73d || Sinfonia IV || 1962 || Orchestral || Part of Kairos - see M. 194.
|-
| 216 || 82 || Solo Double Bass Sonata || 1962 || Solo Instrument || 
|-
| 217 ||    || Glemselshejren (The Heron of Oblivion) || 1963 || Choral (unaccompanied) || For men's chorus.
|-
| 218 || 83 || Duo Concertante for violin and viola || 1963 || Chamber || Revised 1977.
|-
| 219 || 84 || Requiem for Nietzsche || 1963-64 || Choral || With orchestra.
|-
| 220 ||    || Music for Julius Caesar || 1963 || Incidental music || Lost.
|-
| 221 ||    || Evangeliespråk (Gospel Sayings) || 1964 || Choral (unaccompanied) || 
|-
| 222 ||   || Sinfonia Zieleriana || 1964 || Orchestral || Incomplete.
|-
| 223 || 85 || Sange mod vårdybet/Sól og kavi (Songs towards the Deep of Spring/Sun and Snow) || 1964-65 || Choral (unaccompanied) || Revised 1968.
|-
| 224 || 86 || String Quartet No. 7 || 1964-65 || Chamber (string quartet) || 
|-
| 225 || 87 || String Quartet No. 8 || 1965 || Chamber (string quartet) || 
|-
| 226 ||   88a || Moto austero || 1965 || Piano || 
|-
| 227 || 89 || Violin Sonata No. 3 || 1965 || Chamber || 
|-
| 228 || 92 || String Quartet No. 9 || 1965-66 || Chamber (string quartet) || Revised 1969.
|-
| 229 || 90 || Quartet || 1966 || Chamber || For flute, violin, viola and cello.
|-
| 230 || 91 || Kibkariuk (2nd set of Inuit Songs) || 1966 || Vocal || For alto, clarinet and 3 drums.
|-
| 231 ||   93a || Sonatina for oboe and piano || 1966 || Chamber || 
|-
| 232 || 98 || 3 Jaeger Songs || 1966/68 || Choral (unaccompanied) || 
|-
| 233 || 94 || Zeit || 1966-67 || Vocal || With string quartet accompaniment.
|-
| 234 ||    || En tosset verden (A Crazy World) || 1966 || Choral || For children's choir.
|-
| 235 || 95 || Symphony No. 9 || 1967-68 || Orchestral (symphony) || Revised 1969.
|-
| 236 ||   96a || Liber Canticorum Book V - Beatus Vir || 1967 || Choral (unaccompanied) ||
|-
| 237 ||    || De vilde hvide/Nikke nikke nambo || 1968 || Choral || For children's choir.
|-
| 238 || 97 || Trio || 1968 || Chamber || For flute, cello and piano.
|-
| 239 ||   99a || I Venti (The Winds) || 1968 || Piano || 
|-
| 240 || 100 || Chamber symphony No. 2, Elegy || 1968 || Orchestral || 
|-
| 241 || 101 || Solo Cello Sonata || 1968-69 || Solo Instrument || 
|-
| 242 ||   32b || Suite from Den  galsindede tyrk (The Ill-Tempered Turk) || 1969 || Orchestral || Taken from M. 134.
|-
| 243 || 102 || String Quartet No. 10 || 1969 || Chamber (string quartet) || 
|-
| 244 ||    || Film score, Multityder (Multitudes) || 1969 || Incidental music || 
|-
| 245 ||   || 5 Späte Lieder (Late Songs) || 1969 || Vocal || 
|-
| 246 ||   103a || Chamber symphony No. 3, Frise (Frieze) || 1969-70 || Orchestral || 
|-
| 247 ||    || Solsort (Blackbird) || 1970 || Choral (unaccompanied) || 
|-
| 248 ||   103b || Cantata Profana 'Frise' (Frieze) || 1970 || Choral (unaccompanied) || Arrangement of M. 246.
|-
| 249 || 104 || Musik til Morten (Music for Morten), for oboe quintet || 1970 || Chamber ||
|-
| 250 || 105 || Symphony No. 10 || 1970-71 || Orchestral (symphony) || Revised 1972.
|-
| 251 ||   106a || Fanden løs i vildmosen (The Devil to Pay in the Marsh) || 1971 || Chamber || For clarinet, 2 violins and double bass.
|-
| 252 ||   106b || Musik for fugle og frøer (Music for Birds and Frogs) || 1971 || Chamber || For 2 flutes and 16 bassoons. Alternative version for 2 flutes, bassoon and viola.
|-
| 253 ||   107a || Edward (traditional border ballad) || 1971 || Vocal || With chamber orchestra.
|-
| 254 || 108 || Tempo variabile || 1971-72 || Orchestral (symphonic metamorphosis) || 
|-
| 255 ||   107b || The Wee Wee Man (traditional border ballad) || 1971 || Vocal || With chamber orchestra.
|-
| 256 ||   109a || Ondata I (Waves I) || 1972 || Percussion || 
|-
| 257 ||   88b || Moto austero || 1972 || Piano || Revision of M. 226.
|-
| 258 ||   99b || I Venti (The Winds) || 1972 || Piano || Revision of M. 239.
|-
| 259 ||   110a || 2 Border Ballads No. 1 - A Lyke-Wake Dirge || 1972 || Choral (unaccompanied) || 
|-
| 260 ||   110b || 2 Border Ballads No. 2 - The Wee Wee Man || 1972 || Choral (unaccompanied) || 
|-
| 261 ||    || Cantata No. 13 || 1972 || Choral (unaccompanied) || For Vrå College's 100th anniversary.
|-
| 262 || 111 || String Quartet No. 11, Quartetto Rustico || 1972 || Chamber (string quartet) || 
|-
| 263 ||   || Hyld (Elder Tree) || 1972 || Choral (unaccompanied) || 
|-
| 264 ||   || 2 songs || 1972 || Choral (unaccompanied) || 
|-
| 265 || 112 || Fabula I (Fable I) || 1972 || Organ || 
|-
| 266 || 113 || Contrasti || 1972 || Organ || 
|-
| 267 || 114 || Sextet || 1972-73 || Chamber || For flute, clarinet, bassoon, violin, viola and cello.
|-
| 268 || 115 || Fabula II (Fable II) || 1973 || Organ || 
|-
| 269 || 116 || String Quartet No. 12 || 1973 || Chamber (string quartet) || 
|-
| 270 || 117 || Beatus Parvo || 1973 || Choral || With orchestra.
|-
| 271 || 118 || Diafora (Differences) || 1973-74 || Orchestral || For strings.
|-
| 272 || 119 || Eydna/Lykken (Good Fortune) || 1974 || Choral (unaccompanied) || 
|-
| 273 || 120 || Cello Concerto || 1974 || Concerto || Revised 1979.
|-
| 274 || 121 || Fanfare for 3 trumpets and timpani || 1974 || Chamber || 
|-
| 275 || 122 || Recorder Concerto || 1974 || Concerto || 
|-
| 276 || 123 || Triade || 1974-75 || Chamber || For trumpet and organ.
|-
| 277 || 124 || String Quartet No. 13 || 1975 || Chamber (string quartet) ||
|-
| 278 || 125 || String Quartet No. 14 || 1975 || Chamber (string quartet) ||
|-
| 279 || 126 || Flute Concerto No. 1 || 1975-76 || Concerto || 
|-
| 280 || 127 || Tuba Concerto || 1976 || Concerto || 
|-
| 281 || 128 || Døgnets timer (The Hours of the Day) || 1976 || Chamber (string quartet) || Further work 1978 and 1979 but incomplete. Revised material included in String Quartets 17 to 20.
|-
| 282 ||    || March || 1976 || Brass ||
|-
| 283 || 129 || Nuigen (Now-again), for piano trio || 1976 || Chamber ||
|-
| 284 ||    || 3 Motets || 1976 || Choral || With organ accompaniment.
|-  
| 285 || 130 || Firefir || 1976-77 || Chamber || For 4 flutes (including 1 alto and 1 bass).
|-
| 286 || 131 || Louisiana Concerto for strings || 1977 || Concerto ||
|-
| 287 ||   || Fanfare 77 || 1977 || Orchestral || Composed for Queen Elizabeth II's Silver Jubilee. 
|-
| 288 || 132 || Concerto giocondo e severo || 1977 || Concerto || 
|-
| 289 || 133 || Trio || 1977 || Chamber || For recorder, cello and harpsichord.  Alternatively for flute, cello and piano.
|-
| 290 || 134 ||  Ordet (The Word) || 1977 || Choral || With brass and organ accompaniment. Text from the Bible.
|-
| 291 || 135 || String Quartet No. 15 || 1977-78 || Chamber (string quartet) ||
|-
| 292 ||   109b || Ondata II (Waves II) || 1978 || Percussion ||
|-
|  292a ||    || Klokkeglassets vise (The Bell Glass's Song) || 1978 || Vocal ||
|-
| 293 || 136 || Brass Quintet No. 2 || 1978 || Chamber || 
|-
| 294 || 137 || Trio || 1978 || Chamber || For clarinet, cello and piano.
|-
| 295 ||   138a || Þótt form þín hjúpi graflín (Although a Shroud Covers your Form) || 1978 || Choral (unaccompanied) ||
|-
| 296 ||   138b || Song at Sunset || 1978 || Choral (unaccompanied) || Text by Walt Whitman.
|-
| 297 || 139 || Violin Concerto No. 2 || 1978-79 || Concerto ||
|-
| 298 || 140 || Notater (Notations) || 1979 || Chamber || For 3 trombones (alto, tenor, baritone) and tuba.
|-
| 299 ||   || Konstateringer (Statements) || 1979 || Choral (unaccompanied) ||
|-
| 300 || 141 || Guitar Sonata No. 1 || 1979 || Guitar ||
|-
| 301 || 142 || Guitar Sonata No. 2 || 1979 || Guitar ||
|-
| 302 ||   143a || Accordion Sonata No. 1 || 1979 || Accordion ||
|-
| 303 ||    || Bogtrykkemaskinen (The Printing Press) || 1979 || Chamber || For violin and piano.
|-
| 304 || 144 || Symphony No. 11 || 1980-81 || Orchestral (symphony) || 
|-
| 305 || 145 || Sonata for recorder and harpsichord || 1980 || Chamber ||
|-
| 306 || 146 || String Quartet No. 16 || 1981 || Chamber (string quartet) ||
|-
| 307 || 147 || Flute Concerto No. 2 || 1981-82 || Concerto || 
|-
| 308 || 148 || Music with Horn || 1981 || Chamber || For violin, horn and piano.
|-
| 309 || 149 || 5 Intermezzi || 1981 || Guitar ||
|-
| 310 || 150 || Biblical Cantata || 1981 || Choral || With orchestra.
|-
| 311 || 151 || Brúgvar (Bridges) || 1982 || Choral (unaccompanied) ||
|-
| 312 || 152 || String Quartet No. 17, Mattinata (Morning) || 1982-83 || Chamber (string quartet) ||
|-
| 313 || 156 || String Quartet No. 19, Serata (Evening) || 1982-85 || Chamber (string quartet) ||
|-
| 314 || 153 || String Quartet No. 18, Giornata (Day) || 1982 || Chamber (string quartet) ||
|-
| 315 || 154 || 2 Sarvig Psalms || 1983 || Choral (unaccompanied) ||
|-
| 316 || 155 || Gioco (Game) for string trio || 1983 || Chamber ||
|-
| 317 || 157 || Concerto for Brass || 1983 || Brass || Includes percussion.
|-
| 318 ||   158a || Liber Canticorum Book Va - Hominis dies || 1984 || Choral (unaccompanied) ||
|-
| 319 ||   158b || Liber Canticorum Book Vb - Laudate Dominum || 1984 || Choral (unaccompanied) ||
|-
| 320 || 159 || Ballata (Ballad) for piano quartet || 1984 || Chamber ||
|-
| 321 || 161 || Ode til sjælen (Ode to the Soul) || 1985 || Choral || With brass and organ accompaniment.
|-
| 322 || 160 || String Quartet No. 20, Notturno (Night) || 1985 || Chamber (string quartet) ||
|-
| 323 || 162 || Tuba Sonata || 1985 || Chamber ||
|-
| 324 || 163 || Psalm 84 || 1985 || Choral (unaccompanied) ||
|-
| 325 || 164 || To a Pine Tree || 1986 || Orchestral prelude || 
|-
| 326 || 165 || String Quintet || 1986 || Chamber || A 'double bass' quintet.
|-
| 327 || 166 || To a Dolphin || 1986 || Orchestral prelude ||
|-
| 328 || 167 || Duo Concertanto for violin and guitar || 1986 || Chamber ||
|-
| 329 || 168 || To a Maple Tree || 1986 || Orchestral prelude 
|-
| 330 || 169 || Rejsende (Travellers) || 1986 || Choral (unaccompanied) ||
|-
| 331 || 170 || To a Willow Tree || 1987 || Orchestral prelude ||
|-
| 332 || 171 || Intermezzo concertante for tuba and string orchestra || 1987 || Orchestra with soloist || 
|-
| 333 ||   172a || Trombone Sonata || 1987 || Chamber ||
|-
| 334 ||   172b || Translation || 1987 || Chamber || Revised 1989. For violin, viola, cello, double bass and piano.
|-
| 335 ||   172c || To a Living Stone || 1987 || Orchestral prelude ||
|-
| 336 || 173 || Psalm 65 || 1987 || Choral (unaccompanied) ||
|-
| 337 || 174 || To the Seagulls and Cormorants || 1987 || Orchestral prelude || 
|-
| 338 || 175 || Symphony No. 12 || 1988 || Orchestral (symphony) || 
|-
| 339 || 176 || Parlare del più e del meno (To Talk About This and That) || 1988 || Guitar
|-
| 340 || 177 || Capriccio for clarinet and piano || 1988 || Chamber ||
|-
| 341 || 178 || Solo Viola Sonata || 1988 || Solo Instrument ||
|-
| 342 ||   179a || Accordion Sonata No. 2, Burlesco || 1989 || Accordion ||
|-
| 343 ||   179b || 3 + 3 = 5 || 1989 || Piano || A 3-movement recomposition of M. 342, which is in 5 movements.
|- 
| 344 || 180 || To the Pollution of Nature || 1989 || Orchestral prelude ||
|-
| 345 || 181 || Winter || 1989 || Choral (unaccompanied) ||
|-
| 346 || 182 || Epos || 1989-90 || Chamber || For 2 pianos and 2 percussion.
|-
| 347 ||   || Reminiscenser (Reminiscences) for violin || 1990 || Solo Instrument ||
|-
| 348 || 183 || Die Erfüllung (The Fulfilment) || 1990 || Choral || Revised 1993. With wind and brass accompaniment.
|-
| 349 ||   93b || Sonatina for oboe and piano || 1990 || Chamber || Revision of M. 231.
|-
| 350 ||  || 2 Psalms || 1990 || Choral || With piano or organ accompaniment. First psalm is missing the accompanying text.
|-
| 351 || 184 || To the Victoria Embankment || 1990 || Orchestral prelude ||
|-
| 352 || 185 || Egilskvad (Egill's Ballad) || 1990-91 || Vocal || Revised 1992. With brass quintet accompaniment.
|-
| 353 || 186 || Eco || 1991 || Chamber || For clarinet, cello and piano.
|-
| 354 || 187 || To the Calm Sea || 1991 || Orchestral prelude ||
|-
| 355 ||   || 3 songs || 1991 || Vocal || Revised 1993. To texts by Ibsen.
|-
| 356 || 188 || To the Unsettled Weather || 1991 || Orchestral prelude || 
|-
| 357 || 189 || Viola Concerto || 1991-92 || Concerto ||
|-
| 358 ||   || Via Peria (Per's Path), for string quartet || 1992 || Chamber (string quartet) || Included in Op. 190b.
|-
| 359 ||   190a || Sværm (Swarm), for 2 violins || 1992 || Chamber ||
|-
| 360 ||   190b || Sværm (Swarm), for string quartet || 1992 || Chamber (string quartet) || Arrangement of Op. 190a. 
|-
| 361 ||   191a || Canción y danza (Song and dance) || 1992 || Chamber || For recorder and guitar.
|-
| 362 || 192 || Symphony No. 13 || 1993-94 || Orchestral (symphony) || 
|-
| 363 || 193 || Haiduc (Marauders) || 1993 || Chamber || For violin and piano.
|-
| 364 || 194 || Vinter (Winter) || 1993-94 || Incidental music || To accompany photographic slides by Meta Holmboe, the composer's wife.
|-
| 365 ||   || Untitled work for orchestra (14th symphony?) || 1994-95 || Orchestral || Incomplete. Incorporated into Op. 195.
|-
| 366 ||   || String quartet || 1994-95 || Chamber (string quartet) || Incomplete. Incorporated into Op. 195.
|-
| 367 ||   191b || Springbuk (Springbok), for recorder || 1995 || Solo Instrument ||
|-
| 368 || 195 || String Quartet Concerto || 1995-96 || Concerto || Holmboe's last completed work.
|-
|  || 196 || Ave Maria || 1996 || Vocal || With organ accompaniment.
|-
|  || 197 || String Quartet No. 21, Quartetto Sereno || 1996 || Chamber (string quartet) || Completed by Per Nørgård. 
|-
|  x2P ||  || 2 pieces for piano ||  by 1959 || Piano || Published in Pro piano.
|-
|  x2S ||  || 2 Songs ||  || Choral (unaccompanied) || Texts by Shakespeare, translated into Danish.
|-
|  x3P ||  || 3 pieces for piano ||  by 1952 || Piano || Published in Via nova. 2nd piece is for 4 hands.
|-
|  xFa ||  || Fantastiske stykker {Fantastical pieces) ||  || Piano || Possibly incomplete.
|-
|  xHv ||  || Hvad bøgetræet sang (What the beech tree sang) ||  || Choral (unaccompanied) || Text by Hans Christian Andersen.
|-
|  xPiè ||  || Pièce pour deux mains et piano op. 00 (Piece for two hands and piano op. 00) ||  || Piano || In graphic notation.
|-
|  xPil ||  || Piletræet bøjer sig (The willow is bending) || 1929 || Vocal || Incomplete. Date is approximate.
|-
|  xPl ||  || Pludselig blev mørket lyst igen (Suddenly the darkness became light again) ||  by 1994 || Choral (unaccompanied) || Also version for solo voice and piano.
|-
|  xSc ||  || Schade, Digte (Schade, Poems) ||  || Vocal || Texts by Jens August Schade. For soprano and baritone with flute, violin, cello and piano accompaniment.
|-
|  xSo ||  || Sommer (Summer) ||  by 1943 || Choral (unaccompanied) ||
|-
|  ySi ||  || Arrangement of Sigmundskvæðið (Sigmund's ballad) ||  by 1976 || Choral (unaccompanied) ||
|-
|  yUn ||  || Arrangements of 7 folksongs|| 1983 || Chamber || For balalaika/recorder and guitar.
|-
|-style="display:none;"
| 500 || 500 || ~z || 2000 || ~z || ~z
|}

 References 
Notes

Sources
 The New Grove Dictionary of Music and Musicians (2nd edition, 2001).
 Rapoport, Paul. Vagn Holmboe: a catalogue of his music, discography, bibliography, essays (1st edition). Triad Press, 1974.
 Rapoport, Paul. The Compositions of Vagn Holmobe''. Edition Wilhelm Hansen, 1996.

External links 
 Work list at Edition Wilhelm Hansen, one of Holmboe's main publishers.
 List of chamber music at earsense chamberbase.
 Biography and discography at Dacapo Records.
 BIS Records, company that has recorded numerous works including complete symphonies.

Holmboe